The Iacoberi is a left tributary of the river Teuz in Romania. It flows into the Teuz near Chereluș.

References

Rivers of Romania
Rivers of Arad County